John Ker (1673–1726) was a Scottish spy during the Jacobite risings.

John Ker may also refer to:

John Ker (Latin poet) (died 1741), Scottish academic
John Ker, 1st Duke of Roxburghe (c. 1680–1741)
John Ker, 3rd Duke of Roxburghe (1740–1804), Scottish nobleman and bibliophile
John Ker (planter) (1789–1850), American surgeon, planter, and politician in Louisiana
John Ker (minister) (1819–1886), Scottish ecclesiastical writer and minister
John Ker (priest), Canadian Anglican priest

See also
John Kerr (disambiguation)